A. V. Baliga FRCS (1904–1964) was a physician, an educationist and a Fellow of the Royal College of Surgeons.
Several institutes in India are named after him.

Pandit Jawaharlal Nehru the first Prime Minister of India said about Baliga:

"...He was not only a Brilliant Surgeon but also a good man devoted to good causes, for which he subscribed liberally...His sudden death has deprived India of an outstanding surgeon, a man and a patriot of great merit and accomplishment..."

Early childhood and education

Baliga was born on 26 April 1904 in Kallianpur. His early education was in the Hindu Higher elementary school in Kallianpur. Since there was no high school in Kallianpur, he joined the Christian High School in Udupi. In 1920, Mahatma Gandhi gave a call to students to leave educational institutions run by the British Raj. Baliga left school, but was not readmitted. He joined the National School in Udupi which was affiliated to the Gujarat Vidyapith, a Nationalist institute. Baliga passed his matriculation from there. Since the matriculation was not recognized by the British authorities, he could not be admitted to the M.B.B.S course. He was forced to join the L.C.P.S course at the National Medical College, Bombay. Baliga also had to finance his education by giving private lessons. He finished his L.C.P.S course by standing first in the examinations; he caught the attention of G. V. Deshmukh of KEM Hospital who appointed him house surgeon and physician.

His career
Baliga went to the U.K. on a fellowship. He had to pass the London matriculation for his LRCP, MRCS and finally FRCS. He returned to India in 1933 and was appointed as an assistant honorary surgeon at the KEM Hospital, Bombay; he also started his private practice. From then on until 1964, he rapidly rose in stature as a surgeon both nationally and internationally.

Philanthropy
Baliga was instrumental in establishing the Kanara College of Arts and Sciences in Kumta (renamed as Dr. A. V. Baliga college, Kumta). He also helped establish the M. G. M. College in Udupi, the Kasturba Medical College, Manipal and the Orthopedic children's hospital in Haji Ali, Bombay. He was a founding member of the Association of Surgeons of India and took part in the discussions at the annual conference of the association.

As an international figure
After independence, he was involved in the Goa liberation movement. He was also the chief architect of India's political relations with the former Soviet Union. After the 1962 debacle, he also went on an unofficial diplomatic mission to China.

Being a true democrat, he always dreamt of a free, frank and fearless press. This dream became a reality with the publishing of the "PATRIOT", a daily, and "LINK", a magazine through which he could express independent social and political views.

References

External links
  Dr. Baliga Institutes
 Dr. Baliga and Dr. T. M. A. Pai
 Dr. A. V. Baliga
  Dr. Baliga Memorial Trust

1904 births
1964 deaths
20th-century Indian medical doctors
Fellows of the Royal College of Surgeons
Manipal Academy of Higher Education alumni
Mangaloreans
Goa liberation activists
People from Udupi district
Medical doctors from Karnataka